Marvin Lu Cruz (born December 31, 1985) is a Filipino free agent professional basketball player who lastly played for the GlobalPort Batang Pier of the Philippine Basketball Association. He is the older brother of Mark L. Cruz that also plays as a pro for the Phoenix Fuel Masters of the Philippine Basketball Association

Player Achievements

RP-Harbour Team
Cruz once played as starting point guard for the SEABA gold winner RP-Harbour Team.

He led the PBL in assists and made the Mythical Five, then he also made the All-Tournament team in the PBL Silver Cup while playing for Toyota Balintawak.

With UP Integrated School, he led his team to its first-ever UAAP juniors title in 2002, when he was also named Finals Most Valuable Player. He was also a Mythical Five member in the 69th UAAP season.

References

1985 births
Barako Bull Energy players
Living people
Basketball players from Manila
UP Fighting Maroons basketball players
Philippines men's national basketball team players
Filipino men's basketball players
Point guards
Powerade Tigers players
Barako Bull Energy Boosters players
NorthPort Batang Pier players
Barako Bull Energy draft picks